Events in the year 2019 in Zambia.

Incumbents
President: Edgar Lungu
Vice-President: Inonge Wina 
Chief Justice: Irene Mambilima

Deaths

21 January – Lupando Mwape, politician, Vice-President 2004–2006 (born c. 1950).
19 March – Brenda Muntemba, diplomat (b. 1970).

References

 
2010s in Zambia
Years of the 21st century in Zambia
Zambia
Zambia